Guioa parvifoliola is a species of plant in the family Sapindaceae. It is endemic to the Philippines, on Ilocos Norte.

References

parvifoliola
Endemic flora of the Philippines
Critically endangered flora of Asia
Flora of Luzon
Taxonomy articles created by Polbot
Taxa named by Elmer Drew Merrill